The environmental movement in New Zealand started in the 1950s, a period of rapid social change. Since then numerous high-profile national campaigns have contested various environmental issues. The environmental movement eventually spawned the Values Party, which was the first political party with a strong focus on environmental issues to contest national elections. The Values Party eventually morphed into the Green Party of Aotearoa New Zealand.

Beginnings
A number of commentators consider that the earliest major environmental issue in New Zealand was the national campaign to prevent the raising of the levels of Lakes Manapouri and Te Anau as part of stage two of the development of the Manapouri Power Project. A "Save Manapouri Campaign" ran from 1959 through to 1962, involving organisations such as the Forest and Bird Protection Society and the Scenery Preservation Society, resulting in two petitions to parliament and the formation of the Nature Conservation Council, a government advisory body. The "Save Manapouri Campaign", which commenced in Invercargill in October 1969, became a national campaign in 1970 with a third petition to parliament, a Cabinet Committee report and a Commission of Inquiry. The Save Manapouri debate lasted until the 1972 general election, when the incoming Kirk administration promised not to raise the levels of either Lakes Manapouri and Te Anau, establishing instead the Guardians of Lakes Manapouri and Te Anau to ensure that both lakes would be operated within their natural levels.

Certainly the Save Manapouri Campaign occurred during a time of heightened international concern for the popular concept of the 'environment', but it was neither the first - nor the last - of a succession of campaigns to preserve aspects of New Zealand's natural heritage dating back to the creation of the first scenic reserves and national parks. Earlier 'scenery preservation' campaigns, such as the Waipoua Forest debate, when the Waipoua Preservation Society, campaigned against the government's plans in 1946 to log the Waipoua Forest, included many recognisable elements of later 'environmental' campaigns - appeals to public opposition to the loss of natural landscapes, petitions and on-site consideration of the potential impacts of logging. What was different by 1969, therefore, was the sophistication of the conservation/environmental debate, which was able to use the new international lexicon of 'environmentalism' to describe those tangible and intangible features of the Manapouri landscape, which were threatened by the power project.

Campaigns
Other major issues have included nuclear energy, preventing native forest logging and halting the growing of GE food crops. Logging protests occurred in Whirinaki, Pureora, and on the West Coast of the South Island.

As of 2010 the environmental movement is active in many areas, including opposition to new large-scale hydro dams, protecting conservation land from mining and preventing overuse of water resources.

Organisations
The largest conservation organisation, formed in 1923, is Forest and Bird. Greenpeace New Zealand carries out advocacy and direct action in and around New Zealand. Environment and Conservation Organisations of Aotearoa New Zealand (ECO) is an umbrella organisation of about 50 environmental organisations.

See also
Timeline of the New Zealand environment
Conservation in New Zealand
Environment of New Zealand

References

External links
.
Greenpages - a database of New Zealand environmental organisations

Environmentalism in New Zealand
New Zealand